Sucker Lake may refer to:

In Ontario, Canada:
 Sucker Lake (Manitoulin), a lake in the municipality of Assiginack, Manitoulin District
 Sucker Lake (Nipissing District), in the Unorganized North Part of Nipissing District
In the United States:
 Oswego Lake, a lake in Lake Oswego, Oregon, United States, known as Sucker Lake until 1913
 Sucker Lake (New York), in  St. Lawrence County